Avricourt is the name of the following communes in France:

 Avricourt, Meurthe-et-Moselle, in the Meurthe-et-Moselle department
 Avricourt, Moselle, in the Moselle department
 Avricourt, Oise, in the Oise department